Komagene or by its legal name Yörpaş Regional Foods S.A. (Turkish: Yörpaş Yöresel Yiyecekler Pazarlama A.Ş) is a Turkish çiğ köfte company. It was founded in 2005 and the company's name is inspired by the Kingdom of Commagene that existed until 72 AD. The headquarters of the company is located in Maltepe, Istanbul.

Menu items 
The company has several special menu items such as the Doritos çiğköfte wrap and the çiğköfte taco that is çiğköfte in lavash folded like a taco.

Controversies 
In January 2019, one of the co-founders of Komagene Murat Sivrikaya was caught with a fake id in İzmir. He was also alleged for his association with FETÖ.

References 

Food and drink companies based in Istanbul